Sachin Chaudhary (born 30 September 1983) is an Indian powerlifter. Chaudhary represented India at the 2012 Summer Paralympics in London, United Kingdom, and finished 9th in the men's -82.50 kg event. He took the silver medal at the 2017 Powerlifting World Cup in Dubai with a career-best lift of 200 kg. He competed at the 2018 Commonwealth Games where he won a bronze medal in the heavyweight event.

References

Living people
Indian powerlifters
Paralympic powerlifters of India
Powerlifters at the 2012 Summer Paralympics
1983 births
Commonwealth Games medallists in powerlifting
Commonwealth Games bronze medallists for India
Powerlifters at the 2018 Commonwealth Games
Medallists at the 2018 Commonwealth Games